Jan Povýšil is a Czech former Paralympic swimmer. He has competed in five Paralympic games from 2000 through 2016. He competes in the S4 class and has won five bronze medals in freestyle events.

Povýšil was paralysed following an accident at a water park in Italy in 1997.

References

1982 births
Living people
Swimmers at the 2000 Summer Paralympics
Swimmers at the 2004 Summer Paralympics
Swimmers at the 2008 Summer Paralympics
Swimmers at the 2012 Summer Paralympics
Swimmers at the 2016 Summer Paralympics
Medalists at the 2000 Summer Paralympics
Medalists at the 2008 Summer Paralympics
Medalists at the 2012 Summer Paralympics
Paralympic swimmers of the Czech Republic
S4-classified Paralympic swimmers
Paralympic bronze medalists for the Czech Republic
Paralympic medalists in swimming
Czech male freestyle swimmers
Medalists at the World Para Swimming Championships
Medalists at the World Para Swimming European Championships
Sportspeople from Prague